This is a list of ambassadors of the United States to Canada. The ambassador is the head of the Embassy of the United States in Ottawa.

Prior to 1943, the head of the U.S. diplomatic mission to Canada bore the title of Envoy Extraordinary and Minister Plenipotentiary. The U.S. mission to Canada was upgraded from legation to embassy status in June 1943; Ray Atherton was the first chief of mission to hold ambassadorial rank.

List

See also
Ambassadors of the United States
Canada–United States relations
Embassy of the United States, Ottawa
Foreign relations of Canada
List of ambassadors of Canada to the United States

References

United States Department of State: Background notes on Canada

External links
 United States Department of State: Chiefs of Mission for Canada
 United States Department of State: Canada
 United States Embassy in Ottawa

 
Canada
United States